Nicolás Alejandro Massú Fried (born 10 October 1979), nicknamed El Vampiro (Spanish, 'the vampire'), is a Chilean former professional tennis player. A former world No. 9 in singles, he won the singles and doubles gold medals at the 2004 Athens Olympics. He is the only man to have won both gold medals at the same Games since the re-introduction of Olympic tennis in 1988, and they are Chile's only two Olympic gold medals. Massú also reached the final of the 2003 Madrid Masters and won six singles titles. He is presently the coach of 2020 US Open champion and former world No. 3 Dominic Thiem.

Tennis career

Early years
Massú is Jewish, as is his mother, Sonia Fried. His father, Manuel Massú, is of Lebanese and Palestinian ancestry. His mother is of Israeli and Hungarian-Jewish descent. His maternal grandfather, Ladislao Fried Klein, was a Hungarian-born Jew who survived the Nazi occupation of Hungary by hiding, as his parents did not survive. His maternal grandmother, Veronika (née Vegvari), was a Holocaust survivor who was imprisoned inside the Auschwitz concentration camp.

Massú was introduced to tennis by his grandfather at age five. From age 12, he was trained at the Valle Dorado tennis academy, near Villa Alemana, by Leonardo Zuleta, with whom he perfected his forehand and double-handed backhand. He later trained at the Nick Bollettieri Academy, in Florida, alongside Marcelo Ríos, and later at the High Performance Center in Barcelona, Spain.

Juniors

Massú became a professional tennis player in 1997. That year, he won the prestigious juniors year-end Orange Bowl tournament and was doubles world champion, as well as No. 5 in singles. He also claimed the boys' doubles competitions at both Wimbledon and the US Open, partnering Peru's Luis Horna at the former and countryman Fernando González at the latter.

ATP Tour
In August 1998, Massú won his first Futures tournament, in Spain. The following month, he claimed his first Challenger event, in Ecuador. He won his second Challenger tournament in June 1999, in Italy. In September 1999, he successfully defended his title in Ecuador. In November 1999, he won the Santiago Challenger event and cracked the top 100 in singles for the first time.

In May 2000, Massú reached his first ATP tournament final, at the U.S. Clay Court Championships in Orlando, Florida, where he lost to Fernando González. Later in August, he lost again to another Chilean—Marcelo Ríos—in his US Open debut. In January 2001, Massú reached his second ATP event final, in Adelaide, Australia.

Massú's first ATP title came in February 2002 in Buenos Aires, where he defeated Argentine Agustín Calleri in a three-set final, after being down match point. At the 2003 event, Calleri took revenge and defeated him in the first round, a loss that pushed Massú out of the top 100 in singles and forced him to play Challengers once again. In April 2003, he reached the Bermuda Challenger final.

Massú claimed his second ATP title in July 2003 in Amersfoort, Netherlands. The following week, he reached the final of the Kitzbühel tournament, cracking the top 50 in singles for the first time. In September, he made three consecutive tournament finals, including a win at a Challenger event and his third ATP title in Palermo. In October, he reached the final at the Madrid Masters Series tournament, losing to Juan Carlos Ferrero in the final. He ended the year at world No. 12.

In mid-2004, Massú parted ways with Argentine coach Gabriel Markus, whom he replaced with Chilean Patricio Rodríguez. In July 2004, Massú won his fourth ATP title in Kitzbühel and then went on to win two gold medals at the 2004 Olympics (see below). Thanks to his outstanding performance at the Olympics, he reached his career-high ATP singles ranking of world No. 9. In November, he underwent groin surgery and therefore entered the 2005 season off top form. He ended an unremarkable 2005 with a six-match losing streak, although ironically 2005 also saw his best performance at a Grand Slam tournament as he reached the fourth round of the US Open, losing to Guillermo Coria.

He was the first player to be beaten by Stan Wawrinka in the main draw of a Grand Slam tournament, at the 2005 French Open.

In January 2006, Massú lost to José Acasuso in the final of his hometown event at Viña del Mar. In February, he won his sixth ATP title in Costa do Sauipe, Brazil. In April, he reached the final of the Casablanca event in Morocco. In July, he lost to Novak Djokovic in the final of the Amersfoort tournament.

In January 2007, Massú repeated his Viña del Mar showing of 2006, losing to Luis Horna in straight sets. In July, he began an eight-match losing streak that ended in October in Saint Petersburg.

Massú had an early exit at the Viña del Mar tournament in January 2008, losing to Sergio Roitman in the first round. Because he was defending points from a final showing in 2007, the following week he fell to No. 97 in the world. In July, his singles ranking plummeted to No. 138, his worst since November 1999. Later in the year, he won the Florianópolis II Challenger event and was a finalist in two other tournaments at that level.

Massú began 2009 by not winning a match during his first five tournaments and losing his opening Davis Cup singles match against Croatia in March. He broke his losing streak at the Indian Wells Masters, beating Argentine Eduardo Schwank in three sets in the first round.

Olympics
Massú has represented Chile at three Summer Olympics: 2000 Sydney, 2004 Athens and 2008 Beijing. At the 2000 event's opening ceremony, he was his country's stand in flag bearer after Marcelo Ríos failed to show up. In his first-round match he beat Sláva Doseděl, but lost to Juan Carlos Ferrero in the next round.

The story was different in Athens, where Massú captured both singles and doubles titles. On August 21, he and Fernando González defeated Nicolas Kiefer and Rainer Schüttler of Germany to win the doubles competition, making history by giving Chile its first ever Olympic gold medal in any sport, after nearly a full century of Olympic participation. Massú and González came from four straight match points in the fourth set tie-break to claim the gold. The following day, he captured his second gold medal by defeating American Mardy Fish in five sets in the men's singles final. Following his victory in singles, he was declared as Athlete of the Day by the 2004 Athens Olympics' organization.

Because of his low ranking, Massú was granted a wild card to compete in both singles and doubles events in Beijing. He only managed to reach the second round in singles and was ousted on his first match in doubles, where he partnered again with Fernando González. To this day, Massú is the only male player in the Open Era to have won gold medals in both singles and doubles at the same Olympic Games.

Davis Cup
Massú began playing for Chile in Davis Cup matches in 1996. He played in the World Group, representing Chile in the years from 2005 to 2007 and again from 2009 to 2011. He ended his participation with a record of 29–17, including 17–4 on clay.

In 2014, Massú took the position of captain of the Chile Davis Cup team, with former No. 1 Marcelo Ríos as coach. After five years since the start of his tenure as captain, the team achieved a comeback to the elite group of the competition and qualified for the 2019 Davis Cup Finals, eight years after its last participation.

Maccabiah Games
Massú is a veteran of the 2001 Maccabiah Games in Israel, the international Jewish Olympics.

Coach
Massú currently coaches Dominic Thiem, 2020 US Open Men's Singles Champion and winner of the 2019 Indian Wells Masters 1000 tournament. Massú played one doubles tournament in 2019, partnering Dominic's brother, Moritz Thiem.

Playing style
Massú was known for his fighting spirit, especially when playing for Chile, which he demonstrated at the 2004 Olympics and in numerous Davis Cup matches. He has also turned around difficult matches and had a style characteristic of a clay-court specialist, with strong baseline play characterized by a solid forehand and backhand.

Significant finals

Olympic finals

Singles: 1 (1–0)

Doubles: 1 (1–0)

Masters Series finals

Singles: 1 (0–1)

ATP career finals

Singles: 15 (6 titles, 9 runner-ups)

Doubles: 3 (1 title, 2 runner-ups)

ATP Challengers & ITF Futures finals

Singles: 18 (10–8)

Team titles

Performance timelines

Singles

Doubles

1Held as Hamburg Masters until 2008 and Madrid Masters from 2009 to 2013.
2Held as Stuttgart Masters until 2001, Madrid Masters from 2002 to 2008 and Shanghai Masters from 2009 to 2013.

Top 10 wins

See also
 List of select Jewish tennis players

Notes
 b. Esqueceu as medalhas de Ouro das Olimpíadas na gaveta da Vila Olímpica em Atenas.

References

External links

 
 
 
 
 
 

Chilean Jews
Chilean male tennis players
Chilean people of Hungarian-Jewish descent
Jewish sportspeople
Chilean people of Israeli descent
Chilean people of Lebanese descent
Chilean people of Palestinian descent
Maccabiah Games competitors for Chile
Competitors at the 2001 Maccabiah Games
Olympic tennis players of Chile
Olympic gold medalists for Chile
Sportspeople from Viña del Mar
Maccabiah Games tennis players
Tennis players at the 2000 Summer Olympics
Tennis players at the 2004 Summer Olympics
Tennis players at the 2008 Summer Olympics
Living people
1979 births
Olympic medalists in tennis
Wimbledon junior champions
US Open (tennis) junior champions
Medalists at the 2004 Summer Olympics
Tennis players at the 2011 Pan American Games
Pan American Games competitors for Chile
Jewish Chilean sportspeople
Grand Slam (tennis) champions in boys' doubles
Sportspeople of Lebanese descent